Bilad Ar Rus District is a district of the Sana'a Governorate, Yemen. , the district had a population of 31,259 inhabitants.

Uzal (sub-district) 
There are four 'Uzal (sub-district) in the district:

'Uzlat Waʽlan
Rubu' awlad Hasan
Alrubu' al-Sharqi (Eastern Quarter)
Rubu' al-'abs

References

Districts of Sanaa Governorate
Bilad Ar Rus District